Three ships of the Royal Navy have borne the name HMS Urgent:

  was a 12-gun gun-brig launched in 1804 and sold in 1816.
  was a wooden paddle packet, previously the General Post Office ship Colonsay. She was transferred to the Navy in 1837 and sold in 1850.
  was an iron screw troopship, purchased on the stocks as  Assaye. She was launched in 1855, converted to a depot ship in 1876, and was sold in 1903.

Royal Navy ship names